Edward Manning  may refer to:

 Edward R. Manning (1944–2011), American basketball player, see Ed Manning
 Edward Manning (Jamaica) (18th century), Jamaican politician
 Edward Manning (minister), Canadian Baptist minister, see Ingraham Ebenezer Bill

See also
 
 Ned Manning, Australian playwright
 Manning